"Good Time" is a song by American electronica project Owl City and Canadian singer Carly Rae Jepsen. It was released as the lead single from Owl City's album The Midsummer Station and was used as the second single from Jepsen's second studio album, Kiss. "Good Time" was written by Matt Thiessen, Brian Lee, and Adam Young of Owl City. The song received generally positive reviews from music critics, with critics describing it as a "summer anthem".

"Good Time" attained commercial success worldwide, reaching No. 1 in Canada, New Zealand, and South Korea, while peaking inside the top ten in twelve additional countries. The success of the song broke the "one-hit wonder" label for both acts; in both cases, it remains their most recent hit.

Background, writing and release
On June 14, 2012, Adam Young announced that he would be collaborating with Carly Rae Jepsen on a new song, claiming that it would be released on June 26, 2012. On June 20, 2012, he released the single "Good Time" via his SoundCloud account. The song was released on iTunes on June 26, 2012. "Good Time" was written by Matt Thiessen, Brian Lee, and Young himself. On August 23, 2012, the song became available in the United Kingdom before the official single release as a digital download on iTunes from Owl City's album The Midsummer Station. An acoustic version of the song was released in 2013 on Owl City's The Midsummer Station - Acoustic EP.

Critical reception
The song has received positive reviews from critics, including Billboard: "It only makes sense that he's joined by Jepsen...[on] a track that could become a radio staple for the rest of the summer," and Entertainment Weekly: "'Good Time' goes down easier than a frozen margarita at a beachfront tiki bar."
On his site The Re-View, British critic Nick Bassett referred to the song as "an uplifting, out and out pop duet which will most definitely ensure that neither artist has to settle for a 'one hit wonder' tag." Lewis Corner of Digital Spy stated that the track is an "addictively fizzy, sweet treat."

Slate'''s Forrest Wickman also called it a "worthy successor" to "Call Me Maybe". He pointed to how "the song opens with a familiar story, and then subverts it, by removing anything that's not squeaky clean." Like Kesha in "TiK ToK," the singer begins the song waking up after a night of hard partying, in his clothes with a song by Prince inside his head. But in contrast, Wickman observes, he's "on the right side of the bed", not hung over, and ready to go out again the next evening. "When a children's choir is tossed in at the end, it's a bit gratuitous, but in this wholesome song why not," he concludes. "'Good Time' is a guilty pleasure, without the guilt." Rolling Stone called the song "mediocre dance pop".

Chart performance
In the US, the song debuted at No. 32 on the US Pop Songs chart and No. 18 on the Billboard Hot 100 for the week dated July 4, reaching No. 8 a few weeks after. The song is the second (and as of 2023, the most recent) to make the top ten on the chart for both artists; Owl City's first top ten single since "Fireflies", and Carly Rae Jepsen's first top-ten single since "Call Me Maybe." It sold a million in the United States by August 29, 2012, and was certified double-platinum by the RIAA. It sold 2,249,000 copies in the US in 2012.

In Canada and New Zealand, it peaked at No. 1, becoming Owl City's first number-one single and Jepsen's second in both countries. The song debuted at No. 17 on the UK Singles Chart on August 26, 2012. The song charted before the single release due to the song being available from Owl City's album, The Midsummer Station. It rose to No. 5 the following week, becoming Owl City's first top 5 UK hit since 2010's "Fireflies".

Music video
Background
The music video was directed by Declan Whitebloom and premiered on Vevo, with Young tweeting a link to the video on July 24, 2012. Most of the video was shot at Silver Mine Lake in Harriman State Park in New York and the rest in New York City. The video features product placement from Fiat, Casio and Beats Electronics.

Synopsis

The music video begins with Jepsen waiting by her Fiat 500 in front of an apartment, when her friends then come out and join her. They then drive away from the haze of New York City. As they drive away, the video alternates between shots of Jepsen and Young with his own group in a Mercury Cougar as they drive down a forest road. They eventually meet up at a small cabin-like building and start drinking slushies. As Jepsen's verse starts, she is shown walking through the forest, with other shots of the rest of the group walking and coming to a campground. Once the hook and chorus begin, Young is seen by a lake, along with other shots of Jepsen and the rest of the group. As the sky darkens, they start dancing around a bonfire. The video concludes with shots of the group dancing and partying through the night.

Live performances

Owl City and Carly Rae Jepsen performed "Good Time" at America's Got Talent Wild Card results show on August 22, 2012, and the next day on Today. The duo also performed it in New York on August 25, 2012, during Arthur Ashe Kids' Day, an event that marks the start of the U.S. Open; The Tonight Show with Jay Leno on August 28, and Conan'' on August 29. Jepsen performed "Good Time" with Cody Simpson on Justin Bieber's Believe Tour (selected dates), and with Jared Manierka on her headlining The Summer Kiss Tour.

Lawsuit
In October 2012, Alabama singer and songwriter Allyson Nichole Burnett filed a copyright infringement suit authored by attorney Neville Johnson in a California federal court against Jepsen and Young as well as several publishing companies and performing rights groups. She claimed that Young, Matt Thiessen and Brian Lee copied a prominent motif of her 2010 song, "Ah, It's a Love Song". The lawsuit noted several similarities between the two songs, including an identical pitch sequence (5-3-5-3-2), melodic contour (down, up, down, down), rhythmic construction (8th rest, 8th note, 8th note, 8th note, 8th note, 8th rest, quarter note), and timbre (textless vocals). Burnett also stated that she suffered "emotional and psychological damage" from fans asking why she copied the song.

In January 2014 Jepsen's music publishing company, BMI, reached an agreement with Burnett to place over $800,000 in royalties in an escrow account for the plaintiff's benefit. In return, Burnett agreed to drop her lawsuit. In June 2014 the suit was dropped, after an investigation revealed the song to be an original work. The royalties in escrow were returned to both, with Owl City receiving $525,901.77.

Awards and nominations

Track listing
Digital download
"Good Time" – 3:26

CD single
"Good Time" – 3:26
"Good Time" (Adam Young Remix) – 3:10

UK digital remixes EP
"Good Time" – 3:26
"Good Time" (Adam Young Remix) – 3:10
"Good Time" (Fred Falke Full Remix) – 6:18
"Good Time" (Wideboys Club Remix) – 5:31

Credits and personnel
Recording
 Owl City's vocals recorded at Sky Harbor Studios, Owatonna, Minnesota, United States
 Carly Rae Jepsen's vocals recorded at Signalpath Studios, Almonte, Ontario, Canada
 The Minneapolis Youth Chorus's vocals recorded at The Terrarium, Minneapolis, Minnesota, United States

Personnel
 Adam Young – songwriter, producer, recording, instruments, Minneapolis Youth Chorus vocal recording, vocals
 Matthew Thiessen – songwriter, background vocals
 Brian Lee – songwriter
 Ted Jensen – mastering
 Carly Rae Jepsen - vocals
 Robert Orton – mixing
 Minneapolis Youth Chorus – additional vocals
 Ryan Stewart – Carly Rae Jepsen vocal production
 Ken Friesen – Carly Rae Jepsen vocal recording

Charts

Weekly charts

Year-end charts

Certifications and sales

Release history

See also
List of Canadian Hot 100 number-one singles of 2012
List of number-one singles from the 2010s (New Zealand)
List of UK top-ten singles in 2012

References

2012 singles
Owl City songs
Carly Rae Jepsen songs
Number-one singles in New Zealand
Canadian Hot 100 number-one singles
604 Records singles
Songs written by Adam Young
2012 songs
Songs written by Matt Thiessen
Interscope Records singles
Universal Republic Records singles
Songs written by Brian Lee (songwriter)
Songs involved in plagiarism controversies
Male–female vocal duets
Harriman State Park (New York)
American dance-pop songs
Canadian dance-pop songs